Mohammad Gonsalves, better known by his stage name Modulok, is a rapper based in East York, Ontario.

Discography
Modulok
 Two Cities (Bare Records, 2008) (with Bare Beats)
 Cities and Years (Takaba, 2009)
 You Look So Tragic (Takaba, 2012)

Red Ants (Modulok with Vincent Price)
 Phobos Deimos (Seize the Capital!, 2005)
 Omega Point (Urbnet, 2008)

EPs
 Hydra (Fishgang, 2014) (with Baracuda)

Singles
 "The Jungle Made of Glass / Secret Island" (Seize the Capital!, 2007)

Guest appearances
 Noah23 - "Revolt" from Neophyte Phenotype (2001)
 Baracuda - "Mutagen" from Tetragammoth (2002)
 Noah23 - "Vest" from Tau Ceti (2003)
 Noah23 - "Dead Owl Skunk" from Jupiter Sajitarius (2004)
 Baracuda - "Pecan Dirty Rice" from Knucklebone (2008)
 Noah23 - "Things Get Done" from Rock Paper Scissors (2008)
 Baracuda - "Pecan Dirty Rice Remix", "Party Crashers" & "Taste" from Do Tell (2009)
 Plague Language Fam - "Fast Machine & Dirty Women" from Instant Classic (2009)
 Noah23 - "Keep My Name Off Ya Lips" (2013)

References

External links
 Modulok on Discogs

1979 births
Living people
Underground rappers
Canadian male rappers
People from East York, Toronto
Rappers from Toronto
21st-century Canadian male musicians
21st-century Canadian rappers